René Teulade (17 June 1931 – 13 February 2014) was a member of the Senate of France, representing the Corrèze department.  He was a member of the Socialist Party.

He died of a stroke in 2014.

References

External links
Page on the Senate website

1931 births
2014 deaths
French Senators of the Fifth Republic
Socialist Party (France) politicians
Senators of Corrèze